Huw Swetnam is a British slalom canoeist who has competed since the mid-2000s. He won a silver medal in the K-1 team event at the 2009 ICF Canoe Slalom World Championships in La Seu d'Urgell. He also won three medals in the same event at the European Championships (1 gold, 1 silver and 1 bronze).

He was born in Bramcote. He attended Bramcote hills Primary school and later the comprehensive.

References
12 September 2009 final results for the men's K-1 team event at the 2009 ICF Canoe Slalom World Championships. - accessed 12 September 2009.

English male canoeists
Living people
Year of birth missing (living people)
Medalists at the ICF Canoe Slalom World Championships
People from Bramcote
Sportspeople from Nottinghamshire